This is a listing of the highest-grossing films by year, based on their United States box-office gross. The films are listed by in-year release, rather than the gross they accumulated during a calendar year.

Six different directors have directed the highest-grossing film on multiple occasions: George Lucas, Steven Spielberg, James Cameron, Sam Raimi, Robert Zemeckis, and Chris Columbus. Lucas holds the record with five films, all of which are part of the Star Wars franchise, which he created: the original Star Wars (1977), its sequels The Empire Strikes Back (1980) and Return of the Jedi (1983), and two of its prequels The Phantom Menace (1999), and Revenge of the Sith (2005). Spielberg has directed four of the yearly highest-grossing films: Raiders of the Lost Ark (1981), E.T. the Extra-Terrestrial (1982), Jurassic Park (1993), and Saving Private Ryan (1998). James Cameron has directed three such films: Terminator 2: Judgment Day (1991), Titanic (1997), and Avatar (2009). Sam Raimi, Robert Zemeckis and Chris Columbus have directed two each: Spider-Man (2002) and Spider-Man 3 (2007) for Raimi; Back to the Future (1985) and Forrest Gump (1994) for Zemeckis; Home Alone (1990) and Harry Potter and the Sorcerer's Stone (2001) for Columbus.

Films that are a part of larger film or media franchises are frequently atop the highest-grossing films in the United States. The Star Wars franchise has had the highest-grossing film in 8 different years since 1977. In addition to the five aforementioned which Lucas directed, the franchise has also had The Force Awakens, Rogue One, and The Last Jedi (2015–2017, respectively), top a year. The Marvel Cinematic Universe has had four films atop the yearly U.S. box office: The Avengers (2012), Black Panther (2018), Avengers: Endgame (2019), and Spider-Man: No Way Home (2021). No Way Home also gave the Spider-Man film franchise its third leading film. Batman films, Harry Potter, Top Gun, and Toy Story are the other franchises with two films to top the U.S. box office in a single year.

By in-year release
The following is the annual listing:

See also
 List of highest-grossing films in the United States and Canada

References

American film-related lists
Lists of American films
United States